Sky Atlantic is an Italian-language pay-TV station owned by Sky Italia. It started broadcasting on 9 April 2014.

Programming
The channel relies heavily on screenings of US television programmes from HBO and Showtime.

Original programming

Current
Devils (2020) - Co-production with OCS
Petra (2020)
Romulus (2020)
Domina (2021) - Co-production with Sky Atlantic (UK)
Blocco 181 (2022)
Django (2023) - Co-production with Canal+

Former

Notes

References

External links
  (in Italian)

Sky television channels
Television channels and stations established in 2014
2014 establishments in Italy
Television channels in Italy
Sky Italia